Wow and flutter may refer to:

 Wow (recording) and flutter (electronics and communication), irregularities in the playback speed of analogue recordings
Wow and flutter measurement
 Wow and Flutter, a 1994 EP by Stereolab
 Wow & Flutter, an indie rock band from Portland, Oregon
 Wow and Flutter, a solo album by Wouter Van Belle